Pracana Dam is a concrete buttress dam on the Ocreza, a right (northern) tributary of the Tagus. It is located in the municipality Mação, in Santarém District, Portugal.

Construction of the dam began in 1947. The dam was completed in 1950. It is owned by Companhia Portuguesa de Produção de Electricidade (CPPE). The dam is used for power generation.

Dam
Pracana Dam is a 60 m tall (height above foundation) and 245.5 m long buttress dam with a crest altitude of 115 m. The volume of the dam is 144,000 m³. There is one shaft spillway on the right side of the dam and a chute spillway on the left side. The combined maximum discharge is 2,560 m³/s. There is also a bottom outlet which can discharge up to 52 m³/s.

Reservoir
At full reservoir level of 114 m the reservoir of the dam has a surface area of 5.5 km² and a total capacity of 111.9 mio. m³. The active capacity is 69 (95.6 or 102) mio. m³. Minimum operating level is 97 m. With the 95.6 mio. m³ 9.8 GWh can be produced.

Power plant 
The hydroelectric power plant was commissioned in 1951 (1950). It is operated by EDP. The plant has a nameplate capacity of 41 (14,7 or 40) MW. Its average annual generation is 63.8 (41, 61.8, or 53) GWh.

The power station contains 3 Francis turbine-generators in a surface powerhouse located at the toe of the dam. The first 2 units were commissioned in 1951, the third in 1993. The minimum hydraulic head is 28 m, the maximum 57 m.

See also

 List of power stations in Portugal
 List of dams and reservoirs in Portugal

References

Dams in Portugal
Hydroelectric power stations in Portugal
Buttress dams
Dams completed in 1950
Energy infrastructure completed in 1950
1950 establishments in Portugal
Buildings and structures in Santarém District